The 2022 Pinstripe Bowl was a college football bowl game played on December 29, 2022, at Yankee Stadium in Bronx, New York. The 12th annual Pinstripe Bowl, the game featured the Syracuse Orange and the Minnesota Golden Gophers, teams from the Atlantic Coast Conference and the Big Ten Conference, respectively. The game began at 2:03 p.m. EST and was aired on ESPN. It was one of the 2022–23 bowl games concluding the 2022 FBS football season. Sponsored by lawn mower manufacturing company Bad Boy Mowers, the game was officially known as the Bad Boy Mowers Pinstripe Bowl.

Teams
The game featured Syracuse and Minnesota. This was the sixth meeting between the programs; Minnesota led the all-time series, 3–2.  It was also their second bowl meeting, as they played in the 2013 Texas Bowl, won by Syracuse.

Syracuse

Syracuse compiled a 7–5 regular-season record, 4–4 in conference play. The opened their season with six consecutive wins, and were ranked as high as No. 14 before losing five games in a row. The Orange faced three ranked teams, defeating NC State while losing to Clemson and Florida State.

Minnesota

Minnesota finished their regular season with a 8–4 record, 5–4 in conference play. The opened their season with four consecutive wins, and were ranked No. 21 before losing their next three games. Two of those losses were to ranked opponents; Illinois and Penn State. The Golden Gophers ended their regular season with four wins in five games.

Game summary

Statistics

References

Pinstripe Bowl
Pinstripe Bowl
Pinstripe Bowl
Pinstripe Bowl
Minnesota Golden Gophers football bowl games
Syracuse Orange football bowl games